Ismo Kalevi Falck (born 22 August 1966) is a Finnish former archer who participated in two consecutive Olympic competitions, starting in 1988. He won the silver medal in the Men's Team Competition in 1992 (Barcelona, Spain) alongside Tomi Poikolainen and Jari Lipponen.

References
 

1966 births
Living people
People from Paltamo
Finnish male archers
Archers at the 1988 Summer Olympics
Archers at the 1992 Summer Olympics
Olympic archers of Finland
Olympic silver medalists for Finland
Olympic medalists in archery
Medalists at the 1992 Summer Olympics
Sportspeople from Kainuu
20th-century Finnish people
21st-century Finnish people